Kaunas Maironis University Gymnasium, previously the Constituent Assembly Palace, is a historical building in Kaunas, Lithuania. The building was completed in 1862, but gained its biggest significance in 1920-1927 when the Constituent Assembly of Lithuania and first three editions of the interwar Seimas gathered in the building. Later Seimas was moved to the newly built Palace of Justice and the Seimas.

Gallery

References

Buildings and structures in Kaunas
Mair
Palaces in Kaunas
Legislative buildings in Europe